George Crowe (1921–2011) was an American baseball and basketball player.

George Crowe may also refer to:

George Crowe (cricketer) (1885–1976), English cricketer
George Crowe (ice hockey) (1936–2019), Canadian ice hockey coach
George Crowe (1841–1889), husband of actress Kate Bateman

See also
George Crow, computer entrepreneur